Bektashi Dedebabate is the religious leadership of Bektashi Islam. The dedebabas are the spiritual and religious leaders of the Bektashi community. Bektashis do not consider them as divinely appointed leaders. The current and eighth Bektashi debebaba is Baba Mondi.

List of dedebabas 
List of dedebabas following the 1925 exodus of the Bektashi Order from Turkey to Albania:

See also 
 Baba 
 List of Bektashi topics

References

External links 
 Persecution of Bektashi clergy 

Bektashi Order
Albanian Muslims
Albanian religious leaders